The Lao Neutralist Party was a political party in Laos. It published the Say Kang newspaper.

History
The party was established by Souvanna Phouma on 26 May 1961, and supported a neutral approach to foreign and internal affairs. After a period of inactivity, it contested the 1965 elections, winning fourteen of the 59 seats. The party subsequently suffered internal divisions over suggestions of a potential merger with parties with similar policies, including Peace and Neutrality Party. When a merger did not happen, the party stopped contesting national elections, although it continued to exist into the 1970s.

References

Defunct political parties in Laos
Political parties established in 1961
1961 establishments in Laos
Political parties with year of disestablishment missing